Jadavji Shah Jesani (born December 28, 1981, in India) is a Kenyan cricketer. He made his debut for Kenya in their first ever Twenty20 International against Bangladesh in September 2007.  This is to date his only appearance for the national team.

External links
Cricket Archive

1981 births
Living people
Kenyan cricketers
Kenya Twenty20 International cricketers
Western Chiefs cricketers
People from Bhuj
Gujarati people